"The Walls Fell Down" is the second single by the English rock duo The Marbles with Lead vocals by Graham Bonnet. It was released in March 1969, and was written and produced by Barry Gibb, Robin Gibb, Maurice Gibb, of the Bee Gees, and was produced by Robert Stigwood.

Background
"The Walls Fell Down" was recorded on 10 January 1969 with other Gibb brothers-penned tracks "Love You" and "Little Boy". An instrumental work by three members of Bee Gees: Barry and Maurice Gibb, and drummer Colin Petersen. The song was  released as a follow-up to "Only One Woman" but did not repeat the success of the previous single in the United Kingdom. It reached No. 28 on the UK Singles Chart, but in the Netherlands it reached No. 2.

A promotional video for this song was also released.  The song's original music video features Bonnet with a Gibson SG and Gordon with an acoustic guitar and was televised on a Dutch television. A French TV performance of "The Walls Fell Down" was televised on 192TV.

Personnel
 Graham Bonnet — lead vocals
 Trevor Gordon — backing vocals
 Barry Gibb — guitar
 Maurice Gibb — bass, piano
 Colin Petersen — drums
 Bill Shepherd — orchestral arrangement

Chart performance

References

1969 songs
1969 singles
The Marbles (duo) songs
Songs written by Barry Gibb
Songs written by Robin Gibb
Songs written by Maurice Gibb
Song recordings produced by Barry Gibb
Song recordings produced by Robin Gibb
Song recordings produced by Maurice Gibb
Song recordings produced by Robert Stigwood
Polydor Records singles
Pop ballads
Rock ballads